Dismorphia mirandola is a butterfly in the family Pieridae. It is found in Ecuador and Colombia.

Subspecies
The following subspecies are recognised:
Dismorphia mirandola mirandola (Ecuador)
Dismorphia mirandola discoloria Weymer, 1891 (Colombia)

References

Dismorphiinae
Butterflies described in 1876
Pieridae of South America
Taxa named by William Chapman Hewitson